John H. Estey is a now-disbarred attorney who served as chief of staff to Pennsylvania Governor Ed Rendell from 2003 until 2007. He served as interim president of the Milton Hershey School for the 2013–2014 school year and currently serves as executive vice president – administration at Hershey Trust Company, in Hershey, Pennsylvania.  Before joining Hershey Trust Company, Estey was a partner at Ballard Spahr LLP in Philadelphia, where he was a co-chair of the Government Relations and Regulatory Affairs Group.  He has served as the chairman of the board of commissioners of the Delaware River Port Authority and as chairman of the board of directors of the Philadelphia Regional Port Authority  He serves as chairman of board of directors of the Independence Visitor Center in Philadelphia, and is a member of the boards of directors of the Gettysburg Foundation and the Greater Philadelphia Tourism Marketing Corporation.

He was named to the Pennsylvania Report "PA Report 100" list of politically influential personalities in 2003.

He was named to the PoliticsPA "Power 50" list. In 2010, Politics Magazine named him one of the "Top 10 Democrats" in Pennsylvania.

In May 2016, he was charged with wire fraud, having pocketed $13,000 that an FBI sting operation had given to him in an investigation into illegal lobbying of legislators. On May 10, 2016, he pleaded guilty to a single count of wire fraud, committed in 2011. On February 23, 2017, the Pennsylvania Supreme Court disbarred Estey.

References

Living people
Carleton College alumni
University of Pittsburgh School of Law alumni
Pennsylvania Democrats
Chiefs of staff to United States state governors
Employees of the Pennsylvania General Assembly
Year of birth missing (living people)